Joe Walsh (born 23 July 1993 in New Zealand) is a New Zealand rugby union player who plays for the  in Super Rugby. His primary playing position is prop. He was named in the Blues side in round 7 in 2020.

Reference list

External links
itsrugby.co.uk profile

1993 births
New Zealand rugby union players
Living people
Rugby union props
Blues (Super Rugby) players
Waikato rugby union players
Southland rugby union players
San Diego Legion players
Rugby union players from New Plymouth